River is the fourth studio album by former Guns N' Roses guitarist Izzy Stradlin, and his third to feature ex-Guns N' Roses bass guitarist Duff McKagan.

Track listing
All lyrics and music by Izzy Stradlin, except where noted.
"Jump In Now" (Stradlin/Rick Richards) - 4:47
"Head On Out" - 3:29
"River" - 3:47
"Far Below Me Now" - 3:26
"What I Told You" - 3:22
"Get Away" - 3:09
"Underground" - 2:54
"Shall Walk" - 3:32
"Run-In" - 4:26
"Feelin’ Alright" - 3:35

Personnel
Izzy Stradlin – vocals, rhythm guitar
Rick Richards – lead guitar
Duff McKagan – bass, acoustic guitar
Taz Bentley – drums
Ian McLagan – keyboards

References

2001 albums
Izzy Stradlin albums
Sanctuary Records albums
Albums recorded at Robert Lang Studios